Creators Syndicate (also known as Creators) is an American independent distributor of comic strips and syndicated columns to daily newspapers, websites, and other digital outlets. When founded in 1987, Creators Syndicate became one of the few successful independent syndicates founded since the 1930s and was the first syndicate to allow cartoonists ownership rights to their work. Creators Syndicate is based in Hermosa Beach, California.

History
Creators Syndicate originated on February 13, 1987, after the December 24, 1986-announced sale of the Irvine, California-based News America Syndicate to King Features Syndicate, a print syndication company owned by The Hearst Corporation. The pending sale of News America Syndicate, which was first reported by Advertising Age in October 1986, prompted 36-year-old News America Syndicate president Richard S. Newcombe to leave NAS in January 1987 and use financial backing from London-based publisher Robert Maxwell to form Creators Syndicate before the close of the NAS sale.

Ann Landers, then the world's most widely syndicated newspaper columnist, also announced that she was leaving NAS to join the newly formed Creators Syndicate. Within a month, Creators Syndicate acquired the syndication rights to the enormously popular comic strip B.C., and a few months after that acquired the syndication rights to the cartoon works of Herblock, an American editorial cartoonist and author known for his commentary on domestic and foreign policy.

Milton Caniff was another of several important cartoonists who had tried unsuccessfully to secure rights to their creations. In 1946, he walked away from the enormously popular Terry and the Pirates comic strip because his syndicate insisted that they own his creation. After Creators Syndicate was founded, Caniff sent Newcombe a postcard saying, “To put it on the record: Hooray!!!" Pulitzer Prize-winning cartoonist Mike Peters told Editor & Publisher magazine, "It's long overdue that syndicates realize a new day is here. Indentured servitude went out in the 1500s." Johnny Hart, creator of B.C. and The Wizard of Id, called Creators “a history-making venture in syndication." Bil Keane, creator of The Family Circus, described Creators Syndicate as "the first breath of fresh air the syndicates have had in 100 years of existence." The New York Times ran a story about Newcombe with the headline, “A Superhero for Cartoonists?” Today, largely as a result of Creators Syndicate, all syndicates grant cartoonists ownership rights to their work.

In 1991 Creators Syndicate took over Heritage Features Syndicate, which was part of the conservative Heritage Foundation. In 2008 Creators Syndicate acquired the Copley News Service, a wire service that distributed news, political cartoons, and opinion columns.

In 2011 Jack Newcombe became President of Creators Syndicate, and together with Rick Newcombe started Creators Publishing and Sumner Books, which have published more than 150 titles.

In 2012, after 25 years of operating in the city of Los Angeles, Creators Syndicate moved to nearby Hermosa Beach because of a tax dispute with the city.

Since 2012, Creators has expanded its business to include Creators Publishing, Alpha Comedy, a literary and lifestyle magazine, a political website, a podcast network, and Sumner Books, an e-book and audiobook publishing company.

Creators Syndicate strips and panels

Current (as of 2018)

 Agnes
 Andy Capp
 Archie
 Ask Shagg
 B.C.
 Ballard Street
 The Barn
 Daddy's Home
 Diamond Lil
 Dog Eat Doug
 Dogs of C-Kennel
 Doodles
 Flo & Friends
 For Heaven's Sake
 Free Range
 Heathcliff
 Herb and Jamaal
 Liberty Meadows
 Long Story Short
 MazeToons
 The Meaning of Lila
 Momma (1987–2016; in reruns) — inherited from Field Newspaper Syndicate, who got it from Publishers-Hall Syndicate, where it originally debuted in 1970
 Nest Heads
 One Big Happy
 The Other Coast
 Rubes
 Rugrats (1998–2003; in reruns)
 Scary Gary
 Spectickles
 Speed Bump
 Strange Brew
 Wee Pals (c. 1987–2014; in reruns) — inherited from United Feature Syndicate, who got it from the Register and Tribune Syndicate, who got it from Lew Little Enterprises, where it originally debuted in 1965 
 The Wizard of Id
 Working it Out
 Zack Hill

Discontinued strips

 Cafe con Leche
 Chuckle Bros (2006–2017)
 The Dinette Set (c. 2006–2010) — inherited from King Features; taken over by United Features where it concluded in 2015
 Donald Duck (reruns syndicated through 2015)
 Flare
 Flight Deck
 Girls & Sports (2006–2011)
 Home Office
 Hope & Death
 Mickey Mouse (reruns syndicated through 2015)
 Natural Selection
 Off Center
 On a Claire Day (2006–2014)
 The Quigmans by Buddy Hickerson (1986–2011)
 Recess
 State of the Union
 Thatch
 Thin Lines
 Winnie the Pooh (reruns syndicated until April 2010) — inherited from King Features

References

External links
 
 Creators Syndicate in the News
 Podcasts of Creators Syndicate articles

Comic strip syndicates
Companies based in Los Angeles
Publishing companies established in 1987
Print syndication